Starksia smithvanizi, the brokenbar blenny, is a species of labrisomid blenny native to the Caribbean Sea. This species can reach a length of  SL. The specific name honours the ichthyologist William F. Smith-Vaniz.

References

smithvanizi
Fish described in 2003